Glasgow Fort is a large out-of-town shopping and leisure park located in Glasgow, Scotland, just off Junction 10 of the M8 motorway which runs to the south, surrounded by the residential areas of Provanhall, Garthamlock and Easterhouse. It was opened in 2004, built on land which had been part of Auchinlea Park (previously the site of two quarries) which still exists to its immediate east.

Description
The concept is unusual when compared to other local out-of-town shopping centres such as Braehead and Silverburn, in that it is uncovered and therefore the spaces between units are open to the elements, therefore technically categorising it as a retail park. The design of the area incorporates a "two-sided mall design" intended to recreate a traditional high street.

The scheme opened in October 2004 with Phase 1 of the development providing  of retail accommodation. There are currently over 100 retail units and two additional kiosks. There are approximately 2,500 car parking spaces for the park. In 2016, a new multi-storey car park opened with over 600 spaces in it.

From 2012 to 2013, an extension to Glasgow Fort Shopping was under construction. It opened in October 2013, with hundreds of Glaswegians attending the grand opening. The extension included five new restaurants: Chiquito; Prezzo; Wagamama; TGI Friday's and Harvester, alongside an eight-screen Vue Cinema.

Between 2014 and 2015, another large extension began. With various new restaurants, shops and a large Marks and Spencer, the extension opened in late 2015.

Stores 

Below are just a few of the many stores, as of January 2022:
New Look
TK Maxx
Next
JD Sports
SportsDirect.com
Asda Living
Vue Cinemas
Smiggle
Hobbycraft
Quiz

There is also a Morrisons supermarket in the vicinity, completed about the same time (2005) and sited to the east of the main centre across Auchinlea Park towards Easterhouse, but this is not considered to officially be part of the Fort.

There is also a McDonald's opened in 2021 located in the car park of Morrisons

Transport 
Buses and trains run regularly to Easterhouse railway station (2 miles away) from Glasgow City Centre, in addition to buses from the city to the complex, making Glasgow Fort easily accessible by public transport.

References

External links 

Glasgow Fort at Canmore
Architecture Scotland - Portfolio page with images
Cooper Cromar Architects of the park - Portfolio page with images
Glasgow Fort at Gazetteer for Scotland

Shopping centres in Glasgow
2004 establishments in Scotland
Shopping malls established in 2004